Genoa Central School District  is a school district based in Genoa, Arkansas United States. The district encompasses  of land in Miller County and serves portions of Texarkana.

Schools 
Genoa Central School District supports more than 950 students with more than 150 faculty and staff for its three schools: They have won 6 state championships, 4 in track and cross country and 2 in baseball. (2012, 2014)
 Genoa Central High School, serving grades 9 through 12.
 Gary E. Cobb Middle School, serving grades 5 through 8.
 Genoa Central Ełementary School, serving prekindergarten through grade 4.

References

External links
 

School districts in Arkansas
Texarkana, Arkansas
Education in Miller County, Arkansas